The Anapo (Sicilian: Ànapu) is a river in Sicily whose ancient Greek name is similar to the word for "swallowed up" and at many points on its course it runs underground. The Greek myth of Anapos is associated with it.

The river springs from the Monte Lauro in the Hyblaean Mountains (hills), on the territory of Buscemi, crossing the whole territory of Syracuse, where it flows into the Ionian Sea together with the Ciane.

Its waters now power the hydroelectrical station near Solarino.

References

External links
Fiume Anapo 

Rivers of Italy
Rivers of Sicily
Rivers of the Province of Syracuse
Drainage basins of the Ionian Sea